Desulfitobacterium  is a genus of Gram-positive, strictly anaerobic, rod-shaped, spore-forming bacteria from the family of Peptococcaceae. Desulfitobacterium species have low GC-contents.

Phylogeny
The currently accepted taxonomy is based on the List of Prokaryotic names with Standing in Nomenclature (LPSN) and National Center for Biotechnology Information (NCBI)

See also
 List of bacterial orders
 List of bacteria genera

References

Further reading 
 
 
 
 
 
 

Peptococcaceae
Bacteria genera